Narcy is a commune in the Nièvre department and Bourgogne-Franche-Comté region of eastern France.

Population

See also
Communes of the Nièvre department

References

Communes of Nièvre